A knee is a joint typical of mammals, birds and arthropods.

Knee may also refer to:

Shapes
Structures with relatively sharp bends, such as: 
 Knee (construction), a bent piece of wood that takes stress, as commonly used in construction of wooden boats
 Knee (geography), a distinctive riverbend
 Cypress knee, structure on cypress-tree root

Places
Knees, the German name for Satchinez, Timiș County, Romania

People
Allan Knee, a film and television writer and playwright
Bernie Knee (1924–1994), a singer/musician
Christian Knees (born 1981), a German racing cyclist
Derek Knee, (1922–2014), an interpreter for Field Marshal Bernard Montgomery
Fred Knee (1868–1914), a British trade unionist and socialist politician
Gina Knee (1898–1982), American painter
Miriam Knee (born 1938), a former Australian cricketer

Science and technology
 Hard knee or soft knee, a setting in an electronic audio compressor device 
 Knee energy region in physics is an energy spectra for cosmic rays
 Knee of a curve, for example see maximum power point tracker

Other uses
 Knee (strike), a strike with the kneecap or the surrounding area
 KNEE (FM), a radio station (95.1 FM) licensed to serve Nenana, Alaska, United States
 KNEE-LD, a defunct low-power television station (channel 10) formerly licensed to serve Malaga, etc., Washington, United States
 "Knees", a song by Bebe Rexha from the album Expectations
 "Knees", a 2018 single by Ocean Alley, from the album Chiaroscuro

See also
Kneecap 
 Quarterback kneel, a football play
 Wounded Knee (disambiguation)